Timonikha is the name of several rural localities (villages) in Russia:
Timonikha, Ivanovo Oblast, a village in Kineshemsky District of Ivanovo Oblast
Timonikha, Azletsky Selsoviet, Kharovsky District, Vologda Oblast, a village in Azletsky Selsoviet of Kharovsky District of Vologda Oblast
Timonikha, Kharovsky Selsoviet, Kharovsky District, Vologda Oblast, a village in Kharovsky Selsoviet of Kharovsky District of Vologda Oblast